The 1997 Houston Cougars football team, also known as the Houston Cougars, Houston, or UH represented the University of Houston in the 1997 NCAA Division I-A football season.  It was the 52nd year of season play for Houston. The team was coached by Kim Helton.  The team split its home games between the Houston Astrodome and Robertson Stadium for the last season before moving its games exclusively to Robertson Stadium, the 32,000-person capacity stadium on-campus in Houston.

Schedule

References

Houston
Houston Cougars football seasons
Houston Cougars football